The 1911 Bootle by-election was a by-election held for the British House of Commons constituency of Bootle in Merseyside on 27 March 1911.  It was won by the Conservative Party candidate Bonar Law.

Vacancy 
The seat had become vacant on 13 March 1911 when the sitting Conservative Member of Parliament (MP), 73-year-old Thomas Myles Sandys had resigned from the House of Commons by the procedural device of accepting the office of Steward of the Manor of Northstead, a notional 'office of profit under the crown'. He had held the seat since the 1885 general election, and died on 18 October 1911.

Previous results 
At the previous December 1910 general election, Conservative MP Thomas Sandys was elected unopposed. However, there was a previous contest at the General election in January:

Result 

The result was a victory for the Conservative candidate, Bonar Law, who won the seat with 56% of the votes. He did not contest Bootle in 1918, and was instead elected in the Glasgow Central constituency.

Bonar Law was later elected Leader of the Conservative Party in the House of Commons, and went on to hold a series of ministerial positions before becoming Prime Minister for seven months from 1922 to 1923

See also 
Bootle (UK Parliament constituency)
List of United Kingdom by-elections

References 

1911 elections in the United Kingdom
1911 in England
March 1911 events
1910s in Lancashire
Politics of the Metropolitan Borough of Sefton
By-elections to the Parliament of the United Kingdom in Lancashire constituencies
By-elections to the Parliament of the United Kingdom in Merseyside constituencies
Bootle
Bonar Law